Todd Woodbridge and Mark Woodforde were the defending champions but lost in the first round to Ellis Ferreira and Jan Siemerink.

Ferreira and Siemerink won in the final 5–7, 6–4, 6–1 against Patrick McEnroe and Sandon Stolle.

Seeds
Champion seeds are indicated in bold text while text in italics indicates the round in which those seeds were eliminated.

 Todd Woodbridge /  Mark Woodforde (first round)
 Cyril Suk /  Daniel Vacek (semifinals)
 Grant Connell /  Jonathan Stark (semifinals)
 Patrick McEnroe /  Sandon Stolle (final)

Draw

References
 1996 Peters International Doubles Draw

Men's Doubles
Doubles